Suliszowice  is a village in the administrative district of Gmina Żarki, within Myszków County, Silesian Voivodeship, in southern Poland.

References

Suliszowice